Coulier is a surname. Notable people with the surname include:

Dave Coulier (born 1959), American actor, voice actor, stand-up comedian, impressionist and television host
Gilles Coulier (born 1986), Belgian film director and screenwriter
Mark Coulier (born 1964), British make-up artist